Socha Na Tha is an Indian Hindi-language romantic comedy film, released on 4 March 2005. It was the debut of  Abhay Deol and stars Ayesha Takia and Apoorva Jha. The film marks the directorial debut of Imtiaz Ali. It received positive reviews.

Plot 
Viren (Abhay Deol) and Aditi (Ayesha Takia) are introduced by their families, but Viren refuses to marry because he wants to marry his girlfriend of three years, Karen (Apoorva Jha). Viren's refusal creates tension between the families, as Aditi's aunt feels insulted. However Viren and Aditi meet by coincidence, bond quickly and Viren invites Aditi to accompany him to Goa – he wants her to find out if his girlfriend Karen loves him or not.

In Goa, the two of them grow closer and Karen notices this. Viren realises he has fallen in love with Aditi – however, preparations for his own wedding with Karen are already underway; things get more complicated as he fought very hard to get engaged to Karen because she's a Christian and Viren a Hindu. Despite this, he wants to marry Aditi who has fallen in love with him, too. However, Aditi rejects him out of respect for her aunt and uncle who have engaged her to Mahesh, Aditi's on-and-off boyfriend. After several conversations, Viren finally forgets Aditi, tells the truth to Karen and gets on with his life, feeling miserable.

On the day of Aditi's engagement, Karen meets her and asks her why she is not marrying Viren, now that Viren and Karen have broken up. Karen also tells her that Viren is miserable. Her cousin overhears this conversation and convinces Aditi to elope with Viren, which she does. They apologise to their families and are accepted.

Cast

Music
Songs in order of appearance in the movie.

References

External links 
 

2005 films
2000s Hindi-language films
Films directed by Imtiaz Ali
Vijayta Films films
Hindi films remade in other languages
2005 directorial debut films